This is a list of the National Register of Historic Places listings in Panola County, Texas.

This is intended to be a complete list of properties listed on the National Register of Historic Places in Panola County, Texas. There are three properties listed on the National Register in the county. Two properties are Recorded Texas Historic Landmarks including one that is designated a State Antiquities Landmark while the remaining property is also a State Antiquities Landmark.

Current listings

The locations of National Register properties may be seen in a mapping service provided.

|}

See also

National Register of Historic Places listings in Texas
Recorded Texas Historic Landmarks in Panola County

References

External links

Panola County, Texas
Panola County
Buildings and structures in Panola County, Texas